Latin American Suite is a studio album by the American pianist, composer and bandleader Duke Ellington, mainly recorded in 1968, with one track completed in 1970, and released on the Fantasy label in 1972.

Reception

The AllMusic review by Ken Dryden states: "It's a shame that Ellington chose not to keep any of these originals in his repertoire once work was completed on this album".

Track listing
All compositions by Duke Ellington except as indicated
 "Oclupaca" - 4:20  
 "Chico Cuadradino" (Ellington, Mercer Ellington) - 5:00  
 "Eque" - 3:30  
 "Tina" - 4:34  
 "The Sleeping Lady and the Giant Who Watches over Her" - 7:25  
 "Latin American Sunshine" - 6:52  
 "Brasilliance" - 5:02  
Recorded at National Recording Studio in New York, NY on November 5, 1968 (tracks 1-3 & 5-7) and January 7, 1970 in Las Vegas, Nevada (track 4).

Personnel
Duke Ellington – piano
Cat Anderson, Willie Cook, Mercer Ellington, Cootie Williams - trumpet (tracks 1-3 & 5-7)
Lawrence Brown, Buster Cooper - trombone (tracks 1-3 & 5-7)
Chuck Connors - bass trombone, tenor saxophone (tracks 1-3 & 5-7)
Johnny Hodges - alto saxophone (tracks 1-3 & 5-7)
Russell Procope - alto saxophone, clarinet (tracks 1-3 & 5-7)
Paul Gonsalves tenor saxophone (tracks 1-3 & 5-7)
Harold Ashby - tenor saxophone, clarinet (tracks 1-3 & 5-7)
Harry Carney - baritone saxophone (tracks 1-3 & 5-7)
Jeff Castleman (tracks 1-3 & 5-7), Paul Kondziela (track 4) - bass
Rufus Jones - drums

References

Fantasy Records albums
Duke Ellington albums
1972 albums